The women's vault competition of the gymnastics events at the 2010 Central American and Caribbean Games was held on July 29 in Hormigueros Gymnastics Pavilion at Porta del Sol, Mayagüez, Puerto Rico.

Final

Qualification

References

Events at the 2010 Central American and Caribbean Games
Central American and Caribbean Games
Gymnastics at the 2010 Central American and Caribbean Games